The Midwest Lacrosse Conference (MLC) is a men's National Collegiate Athletic Association (NCAA) Division III lacrosse-only college athletic conference composed of schools located in the Midwestern United States.  All schools are members of conferences that do not sponsor lacrosse.

History
Founding members Adrian College, Albion College, Carthage College, Fontbonne University, Milwaukee School of Engineering, College of Mount St. Joseph and Trine University ratified bylaws on June 2, 2009.  The NCAA recognition of the new conference went into effect September 1, 2009 and conference play began on February 13, 2010.  Many of the MLC members also field women's lacrosse as part of the Midwest Women's Lacrosse Conference, which began in 2011. 

Because the Michigan Intercollegiate Athletic Association added lacrosse beginning with the 2013 season, their members played their last season in the MLC during 2012. Likewise, the College Conference of Illinois and Wisconsin added lacrosse beginning with the 2015 season, so their teams played their last season in the MLC during 2014. The three schools in the Heartland Collegiate Athletic Conference starting playing in the new lacrosse-only Ohio River Lacrosse Conference in 2015 as well.

Beloit College and Cornell College joined the MLC in the spring of 2015. Concordia University Chicago joined in 2016 and Monmouth College joined in 2017. Marian University continued to expand the conference in 2018. 

In 2019, the conference added North Central University and University of Northwestern – St. Paul. Both universities are members of the Upper Midwest Athletic Conference for other sports and had been independent programs for men's lacrosse. Further change came before the 2020 season when the conference added Illinois Tech and Fontbonne announced that the men's lacrosse program would be suspended indefinitely due to low participation numbers for the program. In 2021, the Northern Athletics Collegiate Conference brought its lacrosse-sponsoring institutions - Aurora, Benedictine, Concordia Chicago, Concordia Wisconsin, Illinois Tech, Marian, Milwaukee School of Engineering and affiliate member Beloit - directly under the NACC umbrella. This continues the pattern of the Midwest Lacrosse Conference providing league opportunities for schools until such time that their conference sponsors the sport.

Member schools

Current members

Former Members

References

External links
 Official website

College lacrosse leagues in the United States
College sports in Illinois
College sports in Indiana
College sports in Iowa
College sports in Michigan
College sports in Missouri
College sports in Ohio
College sports in Wisconsin
NCAA Division III conferences
Sports leagues established in 2009
2009 establishments in the United States
Sports in the Midwestern United States